Rele Gallery is a contemporary art space and gallery in Lagos, Nigeria. It is on Military Street, Onikan Lagos and on Victoria Island, Lagos.

History 
Rele was founded by Adenrele Sonariwo, art curator and former accountant, former employee of PricewaterhouseCoopers.

The gallery is part of the Rele Arts Foundation, a nonprofit organisation.

In 2021, the gallery opened a location in Los Angeles, California. It is the first African gallery to open in Los Angeles.

Artists 
Rele Gallery has featured a number of Nigerian-based international artists including Victor Ehikhamenor and Kelechi Amadi-Obi.

Exhibitions and shows 
 The Atlantic Triangle (April 2017) curated by Alfons Hug
 Her Story (2017)
 Tech Meets Art (2015–present) in collaboration with Samsung.
 Selense (2016)
 Strip (May 2015)
 Exhibition curated by the Video Arts Network Lagos & David Dale Gallery  (2015) supported by British Council

The gallery also participated in Art Hamptons Fair (July 2013).

References

External links
 "Rele Arts Gallery"